The 1997–98 Iraq FA Cup was the 21st edition of the Iraq FA Cup as a clubs-only competition. The tournament was won by Al-Zawraa for the 12th time in their history, beating Al-Quwa Al-Jawiya 4–3 on penalties in the final after a 1–1 draw.

Bracket

Matches

Quarter-finals

First legs

Second legs 

Al-Shorta won 6–2 on aggregate.

Al-Zawraa won 5–1 on aggregate.

Al-Quwa Al-Jawiya won 3–1 on aggregate.

Salahaddin won 1–0 on aggregate.

Semi-finals

First legs

Second legs 

Al-Zawraa won 3–1 on aggregate.

Al-Quwa Al-Jawiya won 3–1 on aggregate.

Final

References

External links
 Iraqi Football Website

Iraq FA Cup
Cup